The Trike Icaros Adventure S is a Brazilian ultralight trike, designed and produced by Trike Icaros of São Paulo. The aircraft is supplied complete and ready-to-fly.

Design and development
It features a cable-braced hang glider-style high-wing, weight-shift controls, a two-seats-in-tandem open cockpit with a cockpit fairing, tricycle landing gear with wheel pants and a single engine in pusher configuration. The landing lights are mounted in the wheel pants.

The aircraft is made from bolted-together aluminum tubing, with its single surface wing covered in Dacron sailcloth. Its  span Trike Icaros Millenium wing is supported by a single tube-type kingpost and uses an "A" frame weight-shift control bar. The seat assembly tilts and has an under-seat baggage compartment. The powerplant is a four-cylinder, air and liquid-cooled, four-stroke, dual-ignition  Rotax 912UL engine.

A number of different wings can be fitted to the basic carriage, including the Trike Icaros Omega beginner wing and the high-performance Trike Icaros Xtra.

Specifications (Adventure S with Millenium wing)

References

External links

2000s Brazilian sport aircraft
2000s Brazilian ultralight aircraft
Single-engined pusher aircraft
Ultralight trikes